The Puerto Rican Episcopal Conference (CEP) is the episcopal conference of the Roman Catholic bishops of Puerto Rico, a territory of the United States.

Dioceses and bishops

Roman Catholic Archdiocese of San Juan de Puerto Rico (erected in 1511)
Roberto González Nieves, O.F.M., Archbishop of San Juan

Roman Catholic Diocese of Arecibo (erected in 1960)
Alberto Arturo Figueroa Morales, Bishop of Arecibo
Daniel Fernández Torres, Bishop Emeritus of Arecibo
Roman Catholic Diocese of Caguas (erected in 1964)
Eusebio Ramos Morales, Bishop of Caguas
Enrique Hernández Rivera, Bishop Emeritus of Caguas
Roman Catholic Diocese of Fajardo-Humacao (erected in 2008)
Luis Miranda Rivera, O. Carm., Bishop of Fajardo-Humacao
Roman Catholic Diocese of Mayagüez (erected in 1976)
Ángel Luis Ríos Matos, Bishop of Mayagüez
Álvaro Corrada del Río, S.J., Bishop Emeritus of Mayaguez
Roman Catholic Diocese of Ponce (erected in 1924)
Ruben González Medina, C.M.F., Bishop of Ponce
Félix Lázaro Martinez, Sch. P., Bishop Emeritus of Ponce

Presidents
See footnote
 Cardinal Luis Aponte Martínez, Archbishop of San Juan (1966–1983; was created a cardinal on March 5, 1973)
 Bishop Juan Torres Oliver, Bishop of Ponce (1983–1994)
 Bishop Iñaki Mallona Txertudi, C.P., Bishop of Arecibo (1994–1997)
 Bishop Ulises Aurelio Casiano Vargas, Bishop of Mayagüez (1997–2000)
 Archbishop Roberto Octavio González Nieves, Archbishop of San Juan (2000–December 2007)
 Bishop Ruben González Medina, C.M.F., Bishop of Ponce (December 2007–December 2012)
 Archbishop Roberto Octavio González Nieves, Archbishop of San Juan (December 2012-present)

See also
Roman Catholicism in Puerto Rico
Episcopal conference #North America
List of the Catholic bishops of the United States #Province of San Juan de Puerto Rico
United States Conference of Catholic Bishops (USCCB)

Footnotes

External links
Conferencia Episcopal Puertorriqueña (C.E.P.) (Official Site in Spanish)
Episcopal Conference of Puerto Rico GCatholic.org website
Cheney, David M. Catholic Church in Puerto Rico. Catholic-Hierarchy.org website
Periódico El Visitante de Puerto Rico (The Visitor of Puerto Rico) Official Weekly of the Puerto Rican Episcopal Conference (Official Site in Spanish)

Episcopal conferences
Catholic Church in Puerto Rico
Catholic Church in the United States
Catholic Church in the Caribbean
Christian organizations established in 1966
Catholic organizations established in the 20th century